Yekaterina Valeryevna Volkova (born 15 January 1982) is a Russian actress of theater, film and television. She is known for her television role in a Russian sitcom Voronin's Family (Воронины)  — adaptation of the American TV series Everybody Loves Raymond.

Biography
In 2003, Yekaterina Volkova graduated from the Mikhail Shchepkin Higher Theatre School with honors and was accepted into the group of the State Theatre of film actor. In 2005, he was first taken to a small role in the documentary series Kulagin and Partners. Since 2006, Yekaterina Volkova has begun to actively act in the famous TV series Love is as Love, Who's the Boss?, Montecristo. In 2006 she graduated from the Academy of Budget and Treasury of the Ministry of Finance with honors. In 2009, Catherine was invited to a major role in the adaptation of the American sitcom - series  Voronin's Family. Since 2010, Volkova removed simultaneously in Voronin's Family, in a less popular series  Reflections. In 2010 and 2012, Yekaterina Volkova shot for the magazine MAXІM. She was the winner of 2010.

Personal life
On April 9, 2010 she married dancer Andrey Karpov, whom she met a year before the wedding. The couple have a daughter, Elizaveta (born 2011).

Filmography
 2005 Kulagin and partners (TV Series) as Marta
 2006-2008 Who's the Boss? (TV Series) as Masha
 2006-2007 Love as love (TV Series) as banker
 2006 I stay as Larisa
 2007 Agency "Alibi" (TV Series) as Alena
 2008 Montecristo (TV Series) as Marianna
 2008 Christmas ambush as major Kovalyova
 2008 Verdict as Katya
 2008 Man in black as Elvira
 2009 Crazy Angel (TV Series) as Vika
 2009 Pathfinder. On the trail of golden horse (TV Series) as Marina
 2009 People Shpak as Khomyachkova
 2010 Be my wife! (TV Series) as Polina
 2009-2015 Voronin's Family (TV Series) as Vera Voronina (Zolotaryova)
 2010 Reflections (TV Series) as Larisa
 2016 Survival lessons as Nina,  Kolya's mother

References

External links 
 
 

1982 births
Living people
Actresses from Tallinn
Russian film actresses
Russian television actresses
Russian stage actresses
Actresses from Moscow
21st-century Russian actresses